Arifegazili is a village in the Sungurlu District of Çorum Province in Turkey. Its population is 1,134 (2022). Before the 2013 reorganisation, it was a town (belde).

References

Villages in Sungurlu District